Óscar José Rafael Berger Perdomo (born 11 August 1946) is a Guatemalan politician who served as the President of Guatemala from 2004 to 2008.

Early years and family
Berger was born to an upper-class family with large sugar and coffee holdings. His paternal grandparents were Belgian immigrants. He graduated in law from the private, Jesuit Rafael Landívar University. 

In 1967 he married Wendy Widmann, also from a land-owning Guatemalan family. He had a son, and a grandchild named Juan Pablo Berger.

Political career
In 1985, Berger joined Álvaro Arzú's successful campaign to become mayor of Guatemala City. From January 1991 to June 1999, he was mayor himself. After leaving office, he ran in the 1999 presidential election as the candidate of the National Advancement Party, but lost to Alfonso Portillo.

A representative of the industrial and land oligarchy that financed his electoral campaign, Berger was elected with 54.13% of the vote in the presidential election of December 2003, ahead of his rival from the centre-left, Alvaro Colom. Only 46% of those registered on the electoral rolls took part in the vote.

Berger's party worked for national reconciliation following the civil war that gripped the country until 1996. He undertook a reform of the army, recognized the responsibility of the state for war crimes, accepted the creation of an International Commission against Impunity in Guatemala (Cicig) under a UN mandate, and appointed Rigoberta Menchu, a figure of the pacifist and indigenous movement, as special ambassador to the presidency. Most of the members of his government, however, were from the oligarchy.

Berger supports the Central American Free Trade Agreement (CAFTA) signed with the United States. He pursued a repressive policy towards the peasant movement. It is in this context that the massacre of Nueva Linda took place in August 2004, in which nine peasants were killed by the police. A Cicig report published in 2010 accused the government of Óscar Berger of carrying out "social cleansing" operations and ordering extrajudicial executions. Philip Alston, rapporteur to the United Nations, had already, in 2007, denounced social cleansing operations involving the Guatemalan government.

During Hurricane Stan in 2005, which killed more than a thousand people in Guatemala, Berger declared: "It's not so bad, poor people are used to living like this.

See also
Politics of Guatemala
List of political parties in Guatemala

References

External links

Biography by CIDOB 

Presidents of Guatemala
Mayors of Guatemala City
1946 births
Living people
People from Guatemala City
Crecer politicians
National Solidarity Party (Guatemala) politicians
Rafael Landívar University alumni